The Flat-Tire murders were a series of unsolved murders in Broward and Miami-Dade Counties, Florida, occurring between February 1975 and January 1976. The name originated from the investigators' belief that, when the offender committed two of the murders, he had deflated the tires of the victims' cars. The list of suspected victims ultimately included 12 girls and women whose bodies were discovered in or near South Florida canals. Some forensic experts have questioned whether a single offender was responsible for all the murders, while others have proclaimed that the murderer might have killed more than 30 women in multiple states. The murders were the subject of a 2021 book, The Flat Tire Murders: Unsolved Crimes of a South Florida Serial Killer.

Murders of Ronnie Gorlin and Elyse Rapp
The first murder victim of the Flat-Tire murderer was 27-year-old respiratory therapist Ronnie Sue Gorlin, who went missing on July 22, 1975, after leaving her Miami Beach apartment to visit her mother at Parkway Hospital. The next day, her naked body was found in the Graham Canal, with signs that she had been sexually assaulted and then stabbed to death. Her car, a rented burgundy-white Oldsmobile Cutlass, was found in a shopping center parking lot with a slashed tire. Eight days later, 21-year-old Elyse Rapp, originally from New York City, left her apartment to go shopping, and was last seen at a Hollywood mall in the evening before vanishing. Her car, a rented yellow Chevrolet Vega, was found in the mall's parking lot, also with a deflated tire. The day after, Rapp's body was found in the same canal where Gorlin's body was found earlier. Both women shared the characteristics of being found naked, except for a necklace with the Hebrew inscription for "life" around Rapp's neck and a single sandal on one of Gorlin's feet. Following a forensic autopsy, it was determined that Rapp's cause of death was drowning, but she had been sexually assaulted prior to her death. In both of these cases, the killer had chosen young women who traveled in cars by themselves. In their absence, he had deflated their vehicles' tires, after which he waited for them to return and then offered to fix their tires, presenting himself as a good samaritan.

Investigation
After the discovery of Gorlin and Rapp's bodies, the police first suggested that there was a serial killer active in two counties. According to them, a total of 12 young women killed in South Florida might've been victims of the same offender. The first of them was 20-year-old Judith Ann Oesterling, from Indiana, who went missing on February 1, 1975, from Miami-Dade County after returning home from her job at a massage parlor. Two days later, her body was found in the canal bordering Broward and Miami-Dade. A few days after that, not far from where Oesterling was found, the body of 17-year-old divorcee Arietta Tinker was found in the canal.

Barbara Davis Stephens, 23, the daughter of the president of Anchor Electric Co., went missing on the evening of February 12th, after she said she would travel to Coral Gables to visit a friend. Her car, a cream-olive-silver 1973 Chevrolet Camaro was later found in a parking lot near the center of Miami, with her body later found on February 20 in a wooded lot.

From May 1975 onwards, four other young women were found in the canals of Broward County: 19-year-old Nancy Fox from West Palm Beach, gone missing after going to a laundry in late May and was later found in Fort Lauderdale, apparently beaten to death with a blunt object; Barbara Susan Schreiber and Belinda Darlene Zetterower, both 14 and from Hollywood, were last seen going out on June 18, and their bodies were found two days later on the bank of the canal shot to death, but with no signs of rape. The final victim, 14-year-old Robin Leslie Losch, was found dead on July 11, in a canal about half a mile from where Schreiber and Zetterower's bodies were found. Unlike the other victims, she was fully clothed.

The suspected perpetrator was described as a white male, aged 20–25, well-dressed, physically athletic and attractive, possibly married, likely very intelligent with an above-average IQ and a sexual sadist. Using his charm, he won the trust of potential victims which he would lure to his car. A reward of $1,000 was announced for any information that would lead to his capture.

According to Sgt. Edwin Carlstedt of Sonoma County, California, the Flat-Tire murderer was possibly responsible for upwards of thirty murders across several states since the early 1970s, starting in California. After these killings abruptly ceased in December 1973, nine similar murders were recorded in Washington the following year, but stopped in September. And after that, another spate of killings, in which the perpetrator demonstrated a similar modus operandi to the killer in California and Washington, occurred in Idaho, Utah and Colorado. In most cases, the victims, who physically resembled each other, were beaten and raped before death, with the killer stripping the bodies and throwing them in canals, streams or leaving them near embankments. A total of 35 such murders were recorded, which, according to this theory, were committed by the same man, but this has not been definitely proven.

Subsequently, the list of possible victims included 15-year-old Mary Coppolla and 27-year-old Marlene Annabelli, who had arrived in Fort Lauderdale from Pennsylvania on October 17, 1975, renting a room for a one-week stay at the Lauderdale Beach Club. Her body, strangled with a rope, was found by a motorcyclist nine days later in a dump outside the city. The 12th and final supposed victim was 17-year-old Michelle Winters, whose body was found floating in the Snapper Creek in Pembroke Pines on January 11, 1976. She was last seen in early January in Fort Lauderdale, with friends of the deceased claiming that she had been depressed and planned to enlist in the Navy. Winters' mother told police that her daughter had likely voluntarily entered her killer's car, as she often preferred to hitchhike.

It has been suggested that notorious serial killer Ted Bundy could have been the culprit, but so far, no evidence has been recorded of him being present in Florida during this period. To this day, all the murders remain unsolved.

See also 
 List of fugitives from justice who disappeared
 List of serial killers in the United States

Bibliography

References

External links
 Serial Killer Crime Index
 True Crime Database article on the murders
 "The Flat Tire Murders: Unsolved Crimes of A South Florida Serial Killer" (McFarland & Co. 2021)

1975 in Florida
1976 in Florida
1975 murders in the United States
1976 murders in the United States
American murderers of children
American rapists
Murder in Florida
Miami-Dade County, Florida
Serial murders in the United States
Unidentified American serial killers
Violence against women in the United States